Heidi Arena is an Australian actress who is best known as for her roles as Dawn McConnichie in the comedy series The Librarians, Ms Gonsha in the children's television series Little Lunch, Joanna in the children’s television series  Inbestigators and Audrey Gordon in Audrey's Kitchen.
 
Arena graduated from the National Institute of Dramatic Art in 2003 and has since had many roles in television and theatre. She has two children with her art director husband Mick.

Career
Arena had a recurring role in the drama series Blue Heelers as Captain Marissa Craddock in 2003 and 2004 and a supporting role in the comedy drama series Last Man Standing in 2005. She played deputy head librarian Dawn in three seasons of the ABC series The Librarians.

Arena was a core cast member of the improvisational comedy Thank God You're Here In 2012 and 2013, she played the eponymous host of the satirical cooking show Audrey's Kitchen. The show, created by Working Dog Productions, stars Arena as Audrey Gordon, a fictional celebrity chef whose style is described as "Delia Smith meets Nigella Lawson". Arena had supporting roles on the children's series Nowhere Boys in 2013, The Worst Year Of My Life - Again! in 2014 and Little Lunch in 2015.
 
Arena has appeared in stage productions such as Melbourne Theatre Company's productions of The Drowsy Chaperone, and The Other Place  at The Playhouse and Optimism at Malthouse Theatre.

References

External links

Australian television actresses
Living people
Year of birth missing (living people)